The list of ship commissionings in 1967 includes a chronological list of all ships commissioned in 1967.


See also 

1967
 Ship commissionings